Tyrus Wong (October 25, 1910 – December 30, 2016) was a Chinese-born American artist. He was a painter, animator, calligrapher, muralist, ceramicist, lithographer and kite maker, as well as a set designer and storyboard artist. One of the most-influential and celebrated Asian-American artists of the 20th century, Wong was also a film production illustrator, who worked for Disney and Warner Brothers. He was a muralist for the Works Progress Administration (WPA), as well as a greeting card artist for Hallmark Cards. Most notably, he was the lead production illustrator on Disney's 1942 film Bambi, taking inspiration from Song dynasty art. He also served in the art department of many films, either as a set designer or storyboard artist, such as Rebel Without a Cause (1955), Around the World in 80 Days (1956), Rio Bravo (1959), The Music Man (1962), PT 109 (1963), The Great Race (1965), The Green Berets (1968), and The Wild Bunch (1969), among others.

Wong retired from the film industry in the late 1960s, but continued his work as an artist, spending most of his time designing kites. He also continued to paint, sketch, and design ceramics well into his 90s. He was the subject of the 2015 documentary film, Tyrus, by filmmaker Pamela Tom. Wong died on December 30, 2016, at the age of 106.

Early life
On October 25, 1910, Wong was born as Wong Gen Yeo, in Toisan, Kwangtung, China. Wong's father was "Ben" Sy Po Wong (1871-1935). Wong's mother was Lee See.

On December 30, 1919, Wong and his father boarded the ship S.S. China and sailed to California, U.S. In 1920, when he was nine years old, Wong and his father immigrated to the United States, and never again came into contact with his mother and sister. Wong was initially held at the Angel Island Immigration Station, due to the Chinese Exclusion Act. There he was separated from his father while he waited to be questioned about his identity. Because most Chinese immigration was prohibited under the Chinese Exclusion Act, Wong and his father had to immigrate illegally under assumed identities as "paper sons" of Chinese American sponsors. Wong's paper son name was Look Tai Yow. He did not gain American citizenship until 1946, after the repeal of the Exclusion Act.  After a month, Wong was released from Angel Island. Wong and his father initially relocated to Sacramento. Wong and his father later moved the family to Los Angeles.

Wong's art was encouraged by his father who had him practice calligraphy every night, since they could not afford to give him an art education. While attending Benjamin Franklin Junior High in Pasadena, Wong's teachers noticed his artistic ability and he received a summer scholarship at the Otis Art Institute.  Wong decided to leave junior high for a full-time scholarship at Otis. Wong's father survived on a more modest income, and Wong worked as a janitor at Otis College. He walked for miles to attend classes. He graduated from Otis in 1930 and began working in Hollywood. While the alumnus page gives Wong's graduation year as 1932, the introduction to a video interview sponsored by the school refers to his attendance in 1935. As early as 1933, a Los Angeles newspaper reported that a local art gallery was presenting a one-man show by Wong featuring "monotype drawings and etchings."

Career

Wong's career ranged from working as a Hallmark greeting card designer, to being a Warner Bros. film production illustrator (1942–1968), including drawing set designs and storyboards for several movies, and an inspirational sketch artist (1938–1941) for Disney.

It was his lush pastels that served as inspiration for Bambi (1942), where he was the lead artist of the project. His background paintings for Bambi were inspired by Song dynasty classical Chinese paintings. Although credited as one of several background illustrators, his full contribution to the film was largely unknown for several decades.

Shortly after finishing Bambi, Wong was fired from Disney studios as a consequence of the Disney animators' strike. After leaving Disney, Wong worked at Warner Brothers Studios for 26 years as a production illustrator.

Later, he designed popular greeting cards for Hallmark Cards. After retiring from film work in 1968, Wong turned his skills to making colorful kites (usually animals such as pandas, goldfish, or centipedes). He spent his Saturdays flying his creations on the beach just north of the Santa Monica Pier.

Some of his well-known paintings include Self Portrait (late 1920s), Fire (1939), Reclining Nude (1940s), East (1984) and West (1984). He told an interviewer that he was a "lucky artist". Wong was featured in Mark Wexler's 2009 documentary How to Live Forever, where he discussed his daily lifestyle and his view on mortality, and in Pamela Tom's 2015 documentary Tyrus.

Awards
In 2001, Wong was given a History makers Award (arts) by the Chinese American Museum and was inducted as a Disney Legend.

In 2005, Wong received the Winsor McCay Award at the 33rd Annual Annie Awards.

In 2015, he was given a Lifetime Achievement Award by the San Diego Asian Film Festival.

Exhibitions
The first solo exhibition of Wong's artwork, "Mid-Century Mandarin: The Clay Canvasses of Tyrus Wong," curated by Bill Stern, was organized by the Museum of California Design. It focused on his paintings on dinnerware for Winfield China of Pasadena, California, in the 1940s and 50s, and was presented at Craft and Folk Art Museum (CAFAM) in Los Angeles, July 14 through October 31, 2004.

The Tyrus Wong: A Retrospective exhibit at the Chinese American Museum in Los Angeles, California showcased his work in October–December 2004. According to the museum:

This exhibit showcased the works of Tyrus Wong, who at the age of 93, is one of the earliest and most influential Chinese American artists in the United States. In his long, pioneering career as a local artist, Wong is a seasoned painter, muralist, ceramicist, lithographer, designer, and kite maker. The exhibit also featured Wong's imaginative kites, which he has been building and flying for the past 30 years. Drawn from public and private collections, several of the pieces chosen for this exhibition have not been shown publicly since the 1930s.

In 2007, Wong was one of three illustrators featured in The Art of the Motion Picture Illustrator: William B. Major, Harold Michelson and Tyrus Wong, an exhibit in the Academy of Motion Picture Arts and Sciences's Grand Lobby Gallery in Beverly Hills.

Tyrus Wong is one of the founders of the otherwise all Black artists collective Eleven Associated Artists (later Art West Association). The short lived Los Angeles artists co-op included Wong and African American contemporaries Beulah Woodard, Alice Taylor Gafford and William Pajaud.

Wong's work was featured in "Now Dig This!: Art and Black Los Angeles 1960–1980" an exhibition at the Hammer Museum, October 2011 – January 2012. The exhibition explored the work of African American art pioneers and the multicultural friendships and collaborations that helped define Los Angeles art and creative communities of the period.

His work was also included in the Round the Clock: Chinese American Artists Working in Los Angeles exhibit at the East Los Angeles College Vincent Price Art Museum, January–May 2012.

From August 2013 through February 2014, Wong's work was exhibited at The Walt Disney Family Museum in San Francisco, California in a career retrospective entitled: Water to Paper, Paint to Sky: The Art Of Tyrus Wong. A hardcover book was published by the Walt Disney Family Foundation Press in conjunction with the exhibit.

In 2015, Wong was featured in an eight-decade career retrospective, Water to Paper, Paint to Sky: The Art of Tyrus Wong, at the Museum of Chinese in America in Manhattan, New York City.

Personal life
Wong met Ruth Ng Kim, a second-generation Chinese American from a farming family in Bakersfield, California, at Dragon's Den Restaurant in Los Angeles Chinatown, CA, where she was a waitress. They married on June 27, 1937, in Bakersfield, CA. 
Wong's wife was the secretary to Y.C. Hong, the first Chinese American immigration lawyer, and then became a homemaker after the birth of their children. They have three married daughters: Kay (born 1938), Tai-Ling (born 1943), and Kim (born 1949) and two grandsons, Kevin Fong and Jason Fong. Wong's wife, Ruth Kim Wong, died on January 12, 1995. She was 85. Wong died on December 30, 2016, at the age of 106. Wong is interred at Forest Lawn Memorial Park (Hollywood Hills) in Los Angeles, California.

Legacy
In 2015, filmmaker Pamela Tom wrote and directed a film about Tyrus Wong's life, entitled Tyrus. The film was produced by Gwen Wynne, Tamara Khalaf and Pamela Tom. The film ended up winning Audience Awards at the 2016 Boston Asian American Film Festival as well as the 2015 Hawaii International Film Festival and the 2015 San Diego Asian Film Festival. The film had its national broadcast on PBS's American Masters on September 8, 2017.

On Feb 1, 2017, Wong was honored by Congressman Adam Schiff with a remembrance on the floor of the 115th United States Congress with Schiff's remarks read into the Congressional Record.

On his would-be 108th birthday on October 25, 2018, Tyrus Wong's life and legacy were honored by an animated Google Doodle.

Major works

Paintings 
 Deer on Cliff, 1960s
 The Cove, 1960s
 Imaginary Landscape #1 and #2, 1955

Ceramics 
 Winfield Pottery – Tyrus Wong Iris plate.
 Winfield Pottery – Tyrus Wong California Pink HP flower.

Filmography 

 Bambi (1942) – Animation Department. Animation backgrounds.
 Around the World in Eighty Days (1956) – 1. Art Department. Assistant Art Director. 2. Miscellaneous Crew. Technical advisor.
 How to Live Forever (2009) – Documentary about secrets of long life. Himself.
 When the World Breaks (2010) – Documentary. Himself.
 Angel Island Profiles: Tyrus Wong (2011) – Documentary about himself at age 100.
 Tyrus (2015) – Documentary about himself.

Lithographs drawn and published at Lynton R. Kistler's Lithography Studio <ref>1930s> ref:Tobey C. Moss Gallery>
Large Horse
Horse Looking Up
Horse Looking Down
Horse Looking Left
Horse Looking Right
New Fallen Snow/Deer in the Forest
Blind Pencil Seller

See also
 List of centenarians (artists)

References

External links

 A Profile of Tyrus Wong by Rosalind Chang. Angel Island Immigration Station Foundation.
 
 Tyrus the Movie Documentary of Tyrus Wong's life and career.
 
 Tyrus Wong at Otis.edu

1910 births
2016 deaths
American animators
American artists of Chinese descent
American centenarians
American ceramists
American muralists
American illustrators
20th-century American painters
20th-century male artists
American male painters
21st-century American painters
21st-century male artists
American potters
Background artists
Chinatown, Los Angeles
Chinese animators
Chinese centenarians
Chinese emigrants to the United States
Chinese illustrators
Walt Disney Animation Studios people
Otis College of Art and Design alumni
People from Taishan, Guangdong
Painters from Guangdong
Burials at Forest Lawn Memorial Park (Hollywood Hills)
21st-century ceramists
Hallmark Cards artists
Annie Award winners
Men centenarians